Sherig-ool Dizizhikovich Oorzhak (born July 24, 1942), is a Russian retired politician. He was the leader of Tuva for 21 years, from 1986 to 2007.

Oorzhak graduated from the Timiryazev Moscow Agricultural academy in 1971.

In 1983 he became an activist in the Tuvan branch of the Communist Party. He graduated from Novosibirsk High Communist Party School in 1985. From December 1986 he was First Secretary in the Tuvan branch of the Communist Party of the Soviet Union, making him Tuva's de facto leader.

He was a three-time deputy of the Supreme Soviet of the Tuva Autonomous Soviet Socialist Republic. From 1990 to 1992 he was Chairman of the Council of Ministers (i.e. Prime Minister) of Tuva ASSR. In 1990 he was elected people's deputy of RSFSR. In August 1991 he was defeated by Kaadyr-ool Bicheldei in the race for Chairman of the Supreme Soviet of Tuva ASSR.

On March 15, 1992 he was elected to be President of the Republic of Tuva. In 1993 he was the head of the Constitutional Commission of Tuva (the Constitution was adopted on October 21, 1993). In 1997 he was re-elected as President.

According to the Tuvan constitution, Tuva was "an independent state in association with Russia" and could "declare war and sign international agreements of its own will". During the revision of Russian regional constitutions in 2000, these phrases were removed from the document. The political career of Oorzhak became uncertain after this, leading him to demonstrate his allegiance to the Kremlin by appointing Sergei Pugachev and Lyudmila Narusova to the Federation Council as representatives of Tuva.

In 2001, the newly adopted Tuvan constitution eliminated the position of President, replacing it with the title Head of Republic, enabling Oorzhak to avoid the two-term limit enforced on the president. On March 17, 2002, with 53% of the vote, he was elected as Head of the Republic and changed his title from President to Head of Republic.

He resigned from his position on April 6, 2007 and Sholban Kara-ool was appointed in his place.

Honours and awards
 Order of Merit for the Fatherland, 3rd class (9 April 2007) - "for services to the state and many years of honest work"
 Order of Honour (2002)
 Order of Friendship (1997)

External links
Interview with Oorzhak

1942 births
Living people
People from Tuva
Tuvan people
Heads of the Republic of Tuva
Members of the Federation Council of Russia (1994–1996)
Members of the Federation Council of Russia (1996–2000)
Recipients of the Order "For Merit to the Fatherland", 3rd class
Recipients of the Order of Honour (Russia)